Donald Fox was an American bobsledder who competed in the late 1930s. He won a bronze medal in the four-man event at the 1937 FIBT World Championships in St. Moritz.

References
Bobsleigh four-man world championship medalists since 1930

American male bobsledders
Possibly living people
Year of birth missing